Ninel is a given name. It is feminine in the former Soviet Union and masculine in Romania. In many Soviet cases, it is often considered to be derived from reversing the surname Lenin. It may refer to:

Ninel Aladova (born 1934), Belarusian architect, theorist and educator
Ninel Conde, Mexican singer, actress and television host
Alena and Ninel Karpovich (born 1985), Belarusian twin sister musical duo
Ninel Krutova (born 1926), Russian retired diver
Ninel Kurgapkina (1929–2009), Russian dance teacher and former prima ballerina
Ninel Lukanina (born 1937), Soviet Olympic volleyball player
Ninel Miculescu (born 1985), Romanian weightlifting champion

Romanian masculine given names